Norman Russell Wylie, Lord Wylie,  (26 October 1923 – 7 September 2005) was a British Conservative and Scottish Unionist politician.

Born in Elderslie, he was educated at Paisley Grammar School, St Edmund Hall, Oxford, and the universities of Glasgow and Edinburgh. He served in the Fleet Air Arm from 1942 to 1946. He was Member of Parliament (MP) for Edinburgh Pentlands between October 1964 and February 1974. Between 1970 and 1974 he held the title of Lord Advocate, having briefly been Solicitor General for Scotland from April to October 1964. He was a Senator of the College of Justice from 1974 to 1990, and later served as a Justice of Appeal in the Republic of Botswana from 1994 to 1996.

His son Neville Wylie is an associate professor of politics at the University of Nottingham.

References

External links
 

1923 births
2005 deaths
People from Renfrewshire
People educated at Paisley Grammar School
Fleet Air Arm personnel of World War II
Members of the Parliament of the United Kingdom for Scottish constituencies
Members of the Parliament of the United Kingdom for Edinburgh constituencies
Members of the Privy Council of the United Kingdom
Scottish Conservative Party MPs
Alumni of St Edmund Hall, Oxford
Alumni of the University of Edinburgh
Alumni of the University of Glasgow
Solicitors General for Scotland
Lord Advocates
UK MPs 1964–1966
UK MPs 1966–1970
UK MPs 1970–1974
Wylie
Unionist Party (Scotland) MPs
Ministers in the Macmillan and Douglas-Home governments, 1957–1964